The 2012 Penza Cup was a professional tennis tournament played on hard courts. It was the seventh edition of the tournament which was part of the 2012 ATP Challenger Tour. It took place in Penza, Russia between 16 and 22 July 2012.

Singles main-draw entrants

Seeds

 1 Rankings are as of July 9, 2012.

Other entrants
The following players received wildcards into the singles main draw:
  Ilya Chkoniya
  Aslan Karatsev
  Anton Manegin
  Alexey Tumakov

The following players received entry as an alternate into the singles main draw:
  Victor Baluda
  Mikhail Fufygin

The following players received entry from the qualifying draw:
  Mikhail Biryukov
  Evgeny Karlovskiy
  Richard Muzaev
  Anton Zaitsev

Champions

Singles

 Illya Marchenko def.  Evgeny Donskoy, 7–5, 6–3

Doubles

 Konstantin Kravchuk /  Nikolaus Moser def.  Yuki Bhambri /  Divij Sharan, 6–7(5–7), 6–3, [10–7]

External links

Penza Cup
Penza Cup
2012 in Russian tennis